Erynnis persius, commonly known as Persius duskywing, is a species of butterfly in the family Hesperiidae that occurs in North America. It is a threatened species in Michigan and is protected by law. The subspecies Erynnis persius persius  is listed as endangered in the Connecticut by state authorities.

Description
The upperside of both the forewings and hindwings are a dark brown color. The forewing has clear spots with other dim markings and the patch at the end of the cell is gray. Males have raised white hairs on their forewings. The hindwings are fringed with darker brown to black and have another fringe that is creamy white. Females have a scent scale patch on their 7th abdominal segment. Caterpillars of this species are light green with a reddish cast and covered with fine, short hairs. Their head is all brownish black. Caterpillar hosts include Lupine (Lupinus), golden banner (Thermopsis), Lotus, and other legumes. Adults feed on flower nectar. The larval form of subspecies E. persius persius is dependent on the wild blue lupine, Lupinus perennis, as a host plant.

References

Erynnis
Butterflies of North America
Butterflies described in 1863